Betty Harte (1882–1965) was a leading lady during the heyday of the silent film era, starring in nine feature films and 108 short films. She is credited with writing four screenplays. She chose Betty Harte as her professional name in honor of her favorite author, Bret Harte.

Acting career
Harte appeared on stage with various stock entertainment companies in the eastern United States. While working as a secretary for a newspaper in Los Angeles, California, she was assigned to interview Selig Polyscope Company director Francis Boggs, who liked her appearance and demeanor and quickly signed her to an acting contract. She became the first leading lady of the Selig Polyscope Company's Los Angeles division and appeared in period dramas, swashbucklers, and Westerns.

She starred opposite with the company's flamboyant leading man, Hobart Bosworth, in the films: Dr. Jekyll and Mr. Hyde (1908), The Sultan's Power (1909), The Roman (1910) and Across the Plain's (1910). She later excelled at playing Western heroines and co-starred with Thomas Santschi in Pride of the Range (1910) and Through Fire and Smoke (1911). She also co-starred with the famous Western actor and fellow Pennsylvanian Tom Mix in Pride of the Range (1910) and A Romance of the Rio Grande (1911).

Harte was known for doing her own stunts and while filming an underwater scene in Bermuda for Victory Pictures in the film The Mystery of the Poison Pool (1914) she was bitten by an angel fish and narrowly escaped a serious injury.

Two notable films she appeared in were In the Sultan's Power (1909) and The Coming of Columbus (1912). She co-starred with Hobart Bosworth in the short film In the Sultan's Power, which was the first film that was shot entirely on location in California. She co-starred with Marshall Stedman in the feature film The Coming of Columbus, which was a three-reel melodrama that was completely hand-tinted in Paris, France, and was an early all-color feature film.

Personal life
Harte was born Daisey Mae Light in Lebanon, Pennsylvania, on May 13, 1882, to Theophilus Ozias Light and Agnes Mary Bohn. She had seven siblings, although only three lived to adulthood. By 1900, she was living in Philadelphia, where she was attending private school. She was the cousin of the American stage actress Margaret Illington.  On October 17, 1907, she married Frank Hardy in Pasadena, California; sometime before 1917 they divorced. On September 12, 1917, she married Ralph Lewis Kruger. The 1920 census records states Ralph and Betty were living in Los Angeles, California, and Ralph either worked for or owned a motion picture theater and Betty had no occupation listed as she had retired from her film career four years earlier in 1916.

Throughout her life she was a bird collector and studied ornithology and was a student of botany, especially favoring flowers. While under contract with the Selig Polyscope Company she maintained a large bird enclosure on the grounds of their studio in Edendale, California, where she kept various species including mockingbirds and nightingales.

Harte said of her doctrine of success, "The more you travel, the more you see, the more you learn, the better your chance of interpreting even the smallest role correctly." She described herself as "Hollywood's First Movie Queen."

She died on January 3, 1965, in Sunland, California, and is buried in Glen Haven Memorial Park in Sylmar, California.

Filmography

Screenplays
 The Bridge of Sighs (1915) – scenario
 The Little Stowaway (1912) – short, scenario
 Their Only Son (1911) – short
 The Spy (1911) – short

A scenario is a sketch or outline of a story, which gives the reader an idea of events without including all the details.

Picture gallery

References

External links

 Betty Harte at the American Film Institute Catalog
 Progressive Silent Film List
 Media History Digital Library

1882 births
1965 deaths
American film actresses
American silent film actresses
People from Lebanon, Pennsylvania
20th-century American actresses